Murraylink is an Australian high voltage direct current electricity transmission link between Berri in South Australia and Red Cliffs in Victoria, connecting the two state electricity grids. Murraylink was commissioned in 2002 and is believed to be the world's longest underground transmission system and cost more than A$177 million. It was built by TransEnergie Australia, a subsidiary of Hydro-Québec. It was sold to the Australian Pipeline Trust (APA Group) in March 2006 for A$153 million. In December 2008 ownership of Murraylink (as well as Directlink) was transferred to the newly formed Energy Infrastructure Investments Group, while APA continued as the operator. The ownership of EII is APA with 19.9%, with the balance with Japan-based Marubeni Corporation with 49.9% and Osaka Gas with 30.2%.

Capacity 
The circuit has an operating voltage of 150 kV and a transmission capacity of 220 megawatts. The link operates an "HVDC Light" voltage-source converter system, utilising insulated-gate bipolar transistors (IGBT), to convert electricity between alternating current and direct current.

While Murraylink is rated at 220MW, it is unable to operate at capacity during periods of high demand due to limitations in the transmission infrastructure at either end. The limitations relate to thermal overload of transformers or transmission lines supplying the Riverland (for South Australia to Victoria transmission) and western Victoria (for Victoria to South Australia transmission).

Sites

References

External links

HVDC transmission lines
Electric power transmission systems in Australia
Hydro-Québec
Electric power infrastructure in South Australia
Electric power infrastructure in Victoria (Australia)
2002 establishments in Australia
Energy infrastructure completed in 2002